Franka is a Dutch comic book series and strip cartoon.

Franka may also refer to:

Franka Batelić, Croatian female singer
Franka Dietzsch, German athlete
Franka Kamerawerk, German camera manufacturer
Franka Potente, German actress and singer
Joan Franka, Dutch female singer